The Trient Glacier is a 4.3 km long glacier (2007) in the Mont Blanc Massif in the canton of Valais in Switzerland. In 1973 it had an area of 6.4 km².

The upper part of the glacier forms a large plateau named Plateau du Trient.

The glacier constitutes the source of the river Trient.

See also
List of glaciers in Switzerland
List of glaciers
Retreat of glaciers since 1850
Swiss Alps

External links
Swiss glacier monitoring network

Glaciers of Valais
Glaciers of the Alps